Pi Aquilae, Latinised from π Aquilae, is the Bayer designation for a binary star system in the equatorial constellation of Aquila, about 3° to the north of the bright star Altair. The apparent visual magnitude of the system is 5.85, making it faintly visible to the naked eye from dark suburban skies.

The binary nature of this system was first discovered by William Herschel in 1785. The primary component of is a magnitude 6.47 giant star with a stellar classification of G8 III:. A companion star at an angular separation of 1.437 arcseconds is an A-type main-sequence star with a classification of A1 V. It is slightly fainter, with an apparent magnitude of 6.75.

References

External links
 HR 7544
 Image Pi Aquilae
 CCDM 19487+1149

187259 60
Binary stars
Aquilae, Pi
Aquila (constellation)
A-type main-sequence stars
G-type giants
097473
Aquilae, 52
7544
BD+11 3994